Manuela Stanukova (born 5 February 1989 in Vraca) is a Bulgarian figure skater. She is the 2006 Bulgarian national bronze medalist. She is a one-time competitor at the World Junior Figure Skating Championships.

External links
 

Bulgarian female single skaters
1989 births
Living people
People from Vratsa